Blues Brothers 2000 is a platform game for the Nintendo 64 console, released by Titus Interactive. The game is a platformer, loosely based on the band and the film. Due to major delays it was released two years after the film of the same name but in the year the film was set.

Gameplay 

The game player starts out as Elwood in Joliet prison who needs to get the band together for the battle of the bands, which is in less than two days. After saving the guitarist, Cab, then defeating the warden, the player's progresses through Chicago, in hopes of finding Mac and Buster. After going about the rooftops, the player enters Willie's Club, where Mac is being held captive. After defeating Willie, Mac says that Buster has escaped to the old graveyard. Arriving there, the player finds that an evil tree has put Buster in a cage. The final battle takes place in a swamp.

Reception 

The game was met with mixed to negative reception upon release; GameRankings gave it a score of 50.89%, while Metacritic gave it 32 out of 100. The earliest review came from Nintendo Power, which gave it a score of 6.8 out of 10 in the August issue, even though the game itself was not released in North America until three months later. Nintendo Official Magazine gave the game a score of 85 out of 100 stating "There’s plenty going on in Blues Brother 2000’s one player, but the multiplayer is a let down.  A great platform romp that hasn’t quite got little Mario’s magic."

References

External links
 

2000 video games
3D platform games
The Blues Brothers
Video games based on musicians
Music video games
Nintendo 64 games
Nintendo 64-only games
Band-centric video games
Multiplayer and single-player video games
Video games developed in the United States